Velagadurru, is a village in West Godavari district of Andhra Pradesh, India.

References

External links
 Velagadurru

Villages in West Godavari district